The University of Georgia School of Social Work (SSW) is a college within the University of Georgia (UGA) in Athens, Georgia, United States.

The School of Social Work opened in 1964.  The School is based in the School of Social Work, adjacent to the university's North Campus. Courses are also offered on the university's Gwinnett campus.

Academic programs

Undergraduate degree
The School of Social Work offers a professional Bachelor of Social Work (BSW) program.  Once they complete certain pre-professional course requirements, undergraduate students from UGA may apply to the program by submitting a narrative and signing the NASW Code of Ethics Statement.

The 127-hour BSW curriculum includes pre-professional requirements; University-wide liberal arts, sciences, cultural diversity, environmental literacy, U.S. and Georgia Constitution, and physical education requirements; and 60 hours of social work major and related courses.

Master of Social Work
There are two areas of concentration for Master of Social Work (MSW) students at UGA.  Students from both concentrations attend the same 30 hours of foundation courses and practicum together for the first year, and many choose electives from the other concentration or the MNPO program.  Both are also available through the Advanced Standing program, which allows recent BSW graduates to complete the MSW program on an accelerated schedule.

Clinical Practice
The Clinical Practice concentration focuses on preparing social workers for supporting individuals and families within their culture, community, and extended family.  The 30-hour concentration includes four required courses, practica at local agencies each semester for 24 hours a week, and two elective courses.

Community Empowerment and Program Development
Students choose the Community Empowerment and Program Development (CEPD) to prepare them for supporting community action, advancing policy, and developing social programs.  The 30-hour concentration includes three required courses, practica at local agencies each semester for 24 hours a week, and three elective courses.

Master of Arts in Nonprofit Organizations
The University of Georgia was among the early institutions to grant a specialized degree in nonprofit management.  The MA in Nonprofit Organizations (MNPO) degree is a 33-hour program administered by the Institute for Nonprofit Organizations (see below) that can be pursued full- or part-time.  All students attend five core courses, four courses in a self-designed area of concentration, and two semester-long internships at 20 hours a week.  Students complete a research project as part of the second placement.

Areas of concentration are wide-ranging and reflect the individual purposes of each student.  Courses may be chosen those offered by the Institute and across the university.

PhD in Social Work
The School began granting the Ph.D. in 1990, preparing social workers for careers in academic or evaluation research.  Students enter the program with a MSW and at least several years of professional work experience.

Graduate Certificate Programs
Students may pursue a graduate certificate in addition to their major field of study.  Certificates offered include:
 Gerontology
 Marriage and Family Therapy
 Nonprofit Organizations

Interdisciplinary Centers and Institutes

Foot Soldier Project for Civil Rights Studies
Founded by current Dean Maurice Daniels, the Foot Soldier Project documents the work and lives of pivotal but unsung "foot soldiers" of the American civil rights movement.  The project works to research, archive, and disseminate information about the lesser-known figures of the movement, and it is a collaborative of the School of Social Work and faculty from across UGA:
 Richard B. Russell Library for Political Research and Studies
 Institute for African American Studies
 African American Cultural Center
 Henry W. Grady College of Journalism and Mass Communication
 College of Education

Institute for Nonprofit Organizations
The Institute for Nonprofit Organizations was developed to bring together research, service, and teaching to foster leadership and effective programs within the civic sector.  In addition to the course offerings of participating departments, the institute directly offers eighteen graduate courses in nonprofit management and development.  Besides faculty from the School of Social Work, the Institute for Nonprofit Organizations involves professors from several other departments:
 J. M. Tull School of Accounting, Terry College of Business
 Department of Agricultural Leadership, Education, and Communication, College of Agricultural and Environmental Sciences
 Department of Family and Child Welfare, College of Family and Consumer Sciences
 Department of Housing and Consumer Economics, College of Family and Consumer Sciences
 Department of Lifelong Education, Administration, and Policy, College of Education
 Department of Public Administration and Policy, School of Public and International Affairs

Marriage and Family Therapy Program
The School of Social Work, College of Education, and College of Family and Consumer Sciences have collaboratively offered graduate certificates in Marriage and Family Therapy for over 20 years.  The program's aim is to provide the course requirements to be licensed in Georgia as a marriage and family therapist.

MSW/MPH Dual Degree Program
The School of Social Work and the College of Public Health collaborated to offer a dual degree masters program, beginning in 2012.  The program of study requires seven consecutive semesters of coursework along with two field placements for completion.

References

External links
 UGA School of Social Work
 UNDERGRADUATE AND PROFESSIONAL DEGREES OFFERED BY THE UNIVERSITY OF GEORGIA, UGA Bulletin
 UGA Graduate Degrees by School or College

Colleges and schools of the University of Georgia
Schools of social work in the United States
1964 establishments in Georgia (U.S. state)
University subdivisions in Georgia (U.S. state)